State Route 235 (SR 235) is a  long north-south state highway in Middle Tennessee. It connects Dickson to Cunningham via Sylvia, Vanleer, and Slayden.

Route description

SR 235 begins in Dickson County as the unsigned companion route of US 70 Business in Dickson at an intersection with US 70/SR 1 (Henslee Drive/College Street). They go west along College Street to pass through a business district and by a hospital to have an intersection with SR 46 (Mathis Drive). The highway then passes through downtown, where it has an intersection with SR 48 (Church Street), before passing through neighborhoods and coming to another intersection with US 70/SR 1 (Henslee Drive), which is now concurrent with SR 46. Here, US 70 Business ends and SR 235 turns west on US 70/SR 1/SR 46 for a short distance before splitting off and turning north along West End Avenue, concurrent with SR 46. SR 46/SR 235 head northwest to leave Dickson and pass through residential areas, where SR 235 splits off to follow Sylvia Road and becomes signed for the first time. SR 235 heads north through farmland to pass by the Dickson County Municipal Airport before passing through the community of Sylvia. Shortly thereafter, SR 235 becomes concurrent with SR 49 and heads northwest to pass through Vanleer along Broad Street and School Street. SR 235 then splits off along Slayden-Marion Road to leave Vanleer and head north to pass through Slayden before entering hilly terrain and crossing into Montgomery County. The highway winds its way north through rural and hilly terrain as Marion Road for the next several miles before coming to an end just west of Cunningham at an intersection with SR 13.

Major intersections

References

235
Transportation in Dickson County, Tennessee
Transportation in Montgomery County, Tennessee